Tipulamima pedunculata is a moth of the family Sesiidae. It is known from Kenya.

References

Sesiidae
Insects of West Africa
Moths of Africa
Moths described in 1910